CHWC-FM is a Canadian radio station that broadcasts a country format at 104.9 FM in Goderich, Ontario. The station uses the on-air brand name Country 104.9. CHWC broadcasts music, morning shows, and weather, in addition to local, National and International news.

On 20 February 2007, the CRTC approved Bayshore Broadcasting's application to operate a new FM radio station at Goderich. The station began regular broadcasting on 15 October 2007.

Previously an adult contemporary station, on January 2, 2018, the station flipped to country branded as Country 104.9.

References

External links
 Country 104.9
 
 

Radio stations established in 2007
Hwc
Hwc
Goderich, Ontario
2007 establishments in Ontario